The men's 15 kilometre classical cross-country skiing competition at the 1988 Winter Olympics in Calgary, Canada, was held on 19 February at the Canmore Nordic Centre.

Each skier started at half a minute intervals, skiing the entire 15 kilometre course. Marco Albarello of Italy was the 1987 World champion and Gunde Svan of Sweden was the defending champion from the 1984 Olympics in Sarajevo, Yugoslavia.

Results
Sources:

References

External links
 Final results (International Ski Federation)

Men's 50 kilometre
Men's 15 kilometre cross-country skiing at the Winter Olympics